New Century Plaza, otherwise or formerly known as Xinshiji Plaza, or Zhengshun Plaza, are twin towers in Dongmen, Shenzhen, China. They are formal abandoned skyscrapers in Shenzhen. Its actual current name is Vanke 68th Shennan Boulevard, which is named after its address. Both of them stand more than 190 meters tall with 45/46 floors. Construction of the buildings started in 1998 and was topped out in 2000. The building features shops and restaurants in the lower decks while the upper decks contains offices, luxury apartments, and luxury hotel.

The main structure and its distinctive 2 golden-coloured façades were largely completed when the developer abandoned the towers due to financial reasons in the same year. Construction halted for 13 years and renovation has only started after the building was sold to another developer in 2013. It was purchased by Vanke in 2015, who currently owns the building. The buildings had a fire after the purchase; fortunately, there were no reported casualties.

See also
 List of tallest buildings in Shenzhen

References

Skyscraper office buildings in Shenzhen
Luohu District
Residential skyscrapers in China
Retail buildings in China
Skyscraper hotels in Shenzhen
Skyscrapers in Shenzhen
Buildings and structures completed in 2016